Ust-Ilimsky District is an administrative district, one of the thirty-three in Irkutsk Oblast, Russia. Municipally, it is incorporated as Ust-Ilimsky Municipal District. It is located in the north of the oblast. Its administrative center is the town of Ust-Ilimsk (which is not administratively a part of the district). As of the 2010 Census, the total population of the district was 18,589.

Administrative and municipal status
Within the framework of administrative divisions, Ust-Ilimsky District is one of the thirty-three in the oblast. The town of Ust-Ilimsk serves as its administrative center, despite being incorporated separately as an administrative unit with the status equal to that of the districts.

As a municipal division, the district is incorporated as Ust-Ilimsky Municipal District. The Town of Ust-Ilimsk is incorporated separately from the district as Ust-Ilimsk Urban Okrug.

References

Notes

Sources

Districts of Irkutsk Oblast
States and territories established in 1968
